Lunda (or Mlundi) was a Latin Catholic Mission sui iuris (primary pre-diocesan missionary jurisdiction) in Angola.

History 
It was established in 1900 on territory split off from the Apostolic Prefecture of Lower Congo in Cubango. 

No ordinary seems to be recorded.

It was suppressed on 4 September 1940 and its territory incorporated into the Metropolitan Archdiocese of Luanda.

References

External links 
 GigaCatholic

Missions sui iuris
Former Roman Catholic dioceses in Africa